Vincent John Basciano (born November 14, 1959) is an American mobster who became  boss of the Bonanno crime family after the arrest of boss Joseph Massino. Basciano was sentenced to life imprisonment without the possibility of parole in 2011.

Biography 
Basciano is nicknamed "Vinny Gorgeous", due to owning a Bronx beauty salon called "Hello Gorgeous", and for his fastidious grooming, hairstyle and looks. In 2011, reporters noted that despite being imprisoned in solitary confinement the past four years, Basciano still looked perfectly groomed in the courtroom.

Arrested in 2004, after a lengthy trial, Basciano was convicted in a racketeering trial for running illegal gambling and attempted murder on May 6, 2006. However, due to a hung jury, Basciano was not convicted of the 2001 murder of Frank Santoro. 

After Basciano's first murder trial, prosecutors retried him on those counts on which the jury hung in the first trial. On August 1, 2007, Basciano was convicted of murdering Santoro, who tried to kidnap Basciano's son.

Previous Bonanno boss Joseph Massino turned state's evidence in 2004 and reported that Basciano had conspired to kill prosecutor Greg Andres, but after Massino failed a polygraph test regarding the discussion he agreed to wear a wire when the acting boss Basciano met Massino in jail. Jurors heard one recording of Basciano boasting, "I'm a hoodlum. I'm a tough guy. Whatever happens happens. Let's go." In another, a wistful Massino mused about the demise of the family. "We was OK until I got pinched," he said. "We was on top of the world.". While Massino was unable to extract an unambiguous confession regarding Andres, he did record Basciano freely admitting to ordering the murder of associate Randolph "Randy" Pizzolo. On May 16, 2011, Basciano was convicted of ordering the 2004 murder of Pizzolo, On June 1, 2011, a jury rejected a prosecution request for the death penalty and instead sentenced Basciano to life imprisonment. Basciano was initially serving his life sentence at the supermax prison ADX Florence, but was transferred to the nearby United States Penitentiary, Florence High in Florence, Colorado for a time and is currently incarcerated at USP Big Sandy.

On March 6, 2014, Basciano's cousin and lawyer Stephen DiCarmine was indicted and charged with defrauding $250 million in bonds, while being the executive director of white-shoe law firm Dewey & LeBoeuf.

See also 
List of Italian American mobsters
List of crime bosses convicted in the 21st century

References 

American people convicted of murder
Bosses of the Bonanno crime family
Bonanno crime family
Gangsters sentenced to life imprisonment
People convicted of racketeering
1959 births
Living people
Inmates of ADX Florence
American people of Italian descent